Tatiana Drozdovskaya (Łacinka: Tacciana Jaŭhienaŭna Drazdoŭskaja; born 6 December 1978 in Minsk) is a Belarusian sailor. She has competed in six editions of the Olympic Games.

Results

World Championships
In 2007, she won the Laser Radial world championship.

Olympics

References

External links
 
 
 

1978 births
Living people
Belarusian female sailors (sport)
Olympic sailors of Belarus
Sailors at the 2000 Summer Olympics – Europe
Sailors at the 2004 Summer Olympics – Europe
Sailors at the 2008 Summer Olympics – Laser Radial
Sailors at the 2012 Summer Olympics – Laser Radial
Sailors at the 2016 Summer Olympics – Laser Radial
Sailors at the 2020 Summer Olympics – Laser Radial
Laser Radial class world champions
World champions in sailing for Belarus
Sportspeople from Minsk